The Newport Beach California Temple is the 122nd temple of the Church of Jesus Christ of Latter-day Saints (LDS Church). The temple was announced on April 21, 2001 and dedicated by Gordon B. Hinckley on August 28, 2005. At the time of its dedication, it was the sixth operating temple in California. Prior to the dedication, 175,000 people attended an open house to tour the building. The open house was disrupted by a small group of protesters who carried signs reading "Mormon Lies Found Here" and "Jesus Warned Against False Prophets" and urged people not to enter. The temple was built to serve the 50,000 Latter-day Saints in Orange County at the time. 

Similar to the Redlands California Temple, it uses interior and exterior architectural themes consistent with what was used in the Spanish missions of the early Western US and Mexico. The interior includes murals of the California coast.

In response to opposition from residents of the surrounding community, the LDS Church made several modifications to the original design. The exterior was changed from white marble or granite to a more pink granite, considered more appropriate for Orange County.

The temple is topped by a cupola holding the traditional statue of the angel Moroni. As with many contemporary LDS temples, the Newport Beach California Temple is built on the grounds of an existing stake center and shares parking with it. It is located on an 8.8-acre campus.

The temple is located in eastern Newport Beach, on Bonita Canyon Road, at Prairie Drive, near California State Route 73.

Gallery

See also

 Comparison of temples of The Church of Jesus Christ of Latter-day Saints
 List of temples of The Church of Jesus Christ of Latter-day Saints
 List of temples of The Church of Jesus Christ of Latter-day Saints by geographic region
 Temple architecture (Latter-day Saints)
 The Church of Jesus Christ of Latter-day Saints in California

References

External links
 
Newport Beach California Temple Official site
Newport Beach California Temple at ChurchofJesusChristTemples.org

21st-century Latter Day Saint temples
Buildings and structures in Newport Beach, California
Religious buildings and structures in Orange County, California
Religious buildings and structures completed in 2005
Temples (LDS Church) in California
2005 establishments in California